The Bristol Open, originally known as the West of England Championships and the West of England Lawn Tennis Championships is a defunct tennis tournament that was originally hosted in Bath, Somerset, England, from 1881 till 1895. It was staged briefly in Bristol, England, in 1896, then from 1920 onwards was hosted again in Bristol annually until the tournament ceased in 1989. The tournament was played on grass courts in the weeks preceding the Wimbledon Championships usually June.

History
The West of England Championships were originally held in Bath from 1881 until 1895; the tournament then transferred to Bristol in 1896. In 1897 the event ceased for period of 24 years. It was reinstated in 1920 and was played in Bristol for the remainder of its run. At the start of the Open Era the tournament was part of the independent tour circuit. In 1971 the event was renamed the Bristol Open; the men's event became part of the World Championship Tennis tour and the women's was part of the International Grand Prix. The women's event stopped in 1973 and was not held again. Although the men's tournament also stopped in 1973, it was reinstated in 1980 and became part of the Grand Prix tennis circuit until 1989.

Champions
Notes: Challenge round: the final round of a tournament, in which the winner of a single-elimination phase faces the previous year's champion, who plays only that one match. The challenge round was used in the early history of tennis (from 1877 through 1921), in some tournaments not all.

Men's singles

Men's doubles

Women's singles

References

External links
http://www.tennisarchives.com/West of England Championships Men's Singles Roll of Honour
ITF Search (search Bristol)

 
Grand Prix tennis circuit
Sports competitions in Bristol
Defunct tennis tournaments in the United Kingdom
1881 establishments in England
Recurring sporting events established in 1881
Recurring sporting events disestablished in 1989
1989 disestablishments in England